Karate was competed by men and women at the 2002 Asian Games in Busan, South Korea.  Kata was contested along with Kumite. There were 11 gold medals contested for this sport. All competition took place at the Yangsan College Gymnasium on October 11 and 12. Each country was limited to having 5 athletes.

Schedule

Medalists

Men

Women

Medal table

Participating nations
A total of 117 athletes from 30 nations competed in karate at the 2002 Asian Games:

References
2002 Asian Games Report, Pages 476–486

External links
Official website

 
2002 Asian Games events
2002
Asian Games
2002 Asian Games